Tele Bim-Bam was a Lithuanian musical TV show for children and now children's singing group.

The musical group was founded in 1990. The first telecasts of the TV show are dated by January 1, 1990. Initially, it was a monthly show for talented children, then it became a biweekly one, accumulating 313 hours of air time to its 20th anniversary.

Currently, Neringa operates a kindergarten and aesthetic education center with the same name, Tele Bim-Bam  in Vilnius.

During over 20 years of the existence of the group over 70 children participated in it and the repertoire includes over 80 songs. Nearly all songs are for solo performance.

Notable songs
Most popular songs of the group, popular both among children and grown-ups, include  „Mane barė“, „Voras“, „Televizorius“, „Baltoji varnelė“, „Naktelės žiedai“, „Musė“ , „Pupa“, „Laivelis“, „Mamos suknelė“ „Jolantėlė“
„Kelionė pas pabaisą“, „Dantukas“, „Mes kitokie“, „Kiški piški“, „Motociklas“, 
etc.

In 2005 the song Pupa performed by Tele Bim-Bam took 4th place in the Lithuanian national finals for Eurovision song contest.

Rūta Pentiokinaitė and  earned the 2nd place in the 16th installation (season 5) of Žvaigždžių duetai (Lithuanian version of Celebrity Duets) with the song "Dvi draugės" ("Two Girl Friends") of Tele Bim-Bam. The couple had eventually won the 5th season of the show performing this song in the second round of the finals.

People

Actress, singer, songwriter and performer Gabriele Malinauskaitė was born on 21 August 1986 in Vilnius, Lithuania. Gabriele was singing in Tele Bim-Bam group, hosted the Tele Bim-Bam show segment for girls „Girls', acted in various episodes of the show, and   performed the role of Butterfly in the rock opera  Voro vestuvės  (The Spider’s Wedding, by the classic Lithuanian poem of Justinas Marcinkevičius with the same name, released for the 18th anniversary of the group) of Tele Bim-Bam.

Not all participants of Tele Bim-Bam continued to pursue musical careers, but some did.

Discography
Tele Bim- Bam Telebimbadienis, CD ASIN: B00D8EH97W
Released to the 10th anniversary of the group
1. peliuku mokykla 2. kiski-piski 3. busimdraugais 4. karakumu asilelis 5. supkit mane 6. kaledos 7. tilili, tilili 8. pupa 9. sirdele spaudzia 10. telebimbadienis
 Tele Bim-Bam – Voro vestuvės, BOD Group – SL-CD-001
TELE BIM-BAM DIDŽIOJI KOLEKCIJA 1 dalis (4CD), ASIN: B017NXM5R
Covering years 1990-2000
CD1 1995 - TELE BIM-BAM, CD2 1996 - "Ne tik Vaikam", CD3 1997 - "Namelis ant Tele Bim-Bam Kojelės", CD4 2000 - "Telebimbadienis"
TELE BIM-BAM DIDŽIOJI KOLEKCIJA 2 dalis (4CD), ASIN: B017NXKGAK
Covering years 2000-2010
CD5 2000 - Neringa iš TELE BIM-BAM "Bet Ne Vaikam", CD6 2004 - TELE BIM-BAM "Gatvė", CD7 2008 - Roko Opera "Voro Vestuvės", CD8 2010 - "Šok į Debesį"
DVD TELE BIM-BAM "Visų laikų geriausi Tele Bim-Bam Videoklipai II dalis", EAN:	4771243131757
19 selected video clips from 1991-2008

Books
2000: Tele Bim-Bam Dainų Knyga (Tele Bim-Bam song book)).
2015: Tele Bim-Bam Pasakos. O kas gi liko? (Tele Bim-Bam  Fairy Tales: And What was Left?)

References

External links
Neringa: "Esu "Tele bim-bam" močiutė"

Lithuanian television shows
Lithuanian music television series
Lithuanian musical groups